How Long Is Forever?, also translated as How Far Is Forever? and How Long Will Eternity Last?, is a 1999 Chinese novella by Tie Ning. Set in Beijing, the novella follows a sincere and altruistic-to-a-fault girl named Bai Daxing who never changes: forever like a meek child, she always gives in to others' demands even as she gets used and dumped over and over again. Through the static Bai Daxing, Tie Ning also explores the changing values in Beijing from the 1970s Cultural Revolution to the 1990s as China experiences rapid economic growth and urbanization.

English translations
 (translated by Lian Wangshu)
 (translated by Qiu Maoru)
 (translated by Vivian H. Zhang)

The novella has also been translated to other languages, such as Thai (as ตลอดกาลน่ะนานแค่ไหน, by Sirindhorn) and Turkish (as Sonsuz Ne Kadar Uzun?, by Nuri Razi).

Awards
1st Lao She Literary Award, 2000
2nd Lu Xun Literary Prize, 2000

Adaptation
How Long Is Forever? has been adapted into a 2001 Chinese TV drama series directed by Chen Weiming, starring Xu Fan as Bai Daxing.

References

1999 Chinese novels
Novels by Tie Ning
Chinese novellas
Novels set in Beijing
Chinese novels adapted into television series